Lee Wan (born 3 May 1984) is a South Korean football defender, who plays for Gangwon FC in K League Challenge.

Club career statistics

External links
 

1984 births
Living people
Association football defenders
South Korean footballers
Jeonnam Dragons players
Gimcheon Sangmu FC players
Ulsan Hyundai FC players
Gwangju FC players
Gangwon FC players
K League 1 players
K League 2 players